Helicoverpa gelotopoeon, the South American bollworm moth, is a moth of the family Noctuidae. It is found in southern South America, including Chile and Argentina.

The larvae are considered a pest on cotton, corn, tobacco, soybean, flax and other crops.

References

Further reading

G
Moths of South America
Noctuidae of South America
Agricultural pest insects
Moths described in 1921